Ceylalictus appendiculata is a species of bee in the genus Ceylalictus, of the family Halictidae.

References

 

Halictidae
Hymenoptera of Asia
Insects of Sri Lanka
Insects described in 1903